Henry I, Count of Holstein-Rendsburg (1258–1304) was the first Count of Holstein-Rendsburg.

Life 
He was the son of Gerhard I, Count of Holstein-Itzehoe (d. 1290) and Elisabeth of Mecklenburg (d. ).
In 1285, he was able to persuade King Eric V of Denmark to release Duke Valdemar IV of Schleswig from captivity.  After the death of his father, the surviving sons divided the county among themselves. Henry was awarded the division of Rendsburg.  He was constantly at war with the Dithmarschen.

Shortly before his death he introduced a toll on imported goods.  Half the proceeds went to Hamburg, the other half was divided between Holstein-Schaumburg and Holstein-Rendsburg.  After the Holstein-Schaumburg line died out in 1640, the Holstein half of the proceeds went to the Duchy of Holstein.  After the Dukes of Holstein died out in 1768, the proceeds went to Hamburg

Seal 
The inscription in his seal reads:  (Seal of Henry, Count of Holstein and Schauenburg).

Marriage and issue 
He married in 1289 to Heilwig (1265 – after 1331), the daughter of Willem II van Bronkhorst, lord of Bronkhorst and Rekem, and of Ermgard van Randerode. The couple had the following children:

 Gerhard III ( – 1 April 1340), married Sophia of Werle, the daughter of Nicholas II of Werle
 Adelaide (d. January 1350), married Duke Eric II of Schleswig (1288–1325)
 Giselbrecht (1290–1345) (counter-) bishop of Halberstadt
 Elizabeth (1300 – before 1340), married:
 in 1315 to Duke John II of Saxe-Lauenburg (1275–1322)
 in 1329 to King Eric of Denmark (1307–1331), divorced in 1331

References

External links 
 
 http://thepeerage.com/p4152.htm#i41519
 Henri Vermeulen, Het Geslacht van Bronkhorst en de boedelscheiding van 26 oktober 1328, in: De Nederlandsche Leeuw, page 102 until 110

Henry 01
House of Schauenburg
1258 births
1304 deaths
13th-century German nobility